Vibeke Merete Wulff Møller (later Boisen, 21 November 1904 – 7 August 1987) was a Danish freestyle swimmer who competed in the 1924 Summer Olympics. She was born in Gentofte. In 1924 she was a member of the Danish relay team which finished fourth in the 4×100 metre freestyle relay competition. In the 400 metre freestyle event she was eliminated in the first round.

References

External links
profile

1904 births
1987 deaths
Olympic swimmers of Denmark
Swimmers at the 1924 Summer Olympics
Danish female freestyle swimmers
People from Gentofte Municipality
Sportspeople from the Capital Region of Denmark
20th-century Danish people